Brisco may refer to:
 Brisco (surname)
 Brisco, British Columbia, an unincorporated community in Canada
 Brisco, Cumbria, a community in Cumbria, England
 Brisco, Indiana, an extinct town in Warren County, Indiana, United States
 Biblical Research Institute Science Council (BRISCO), a Seventh-day Adventist group
 Brisco, lead character in The Adventures of Brisco County, Jr., a 1993 American TV show
 Brisco (rapper), real name British Alexander Mitchell
 Brisco baronets

See also 
 Briscoe (disambiguation)